Benjamin van Niekerk (born 4 January 1996) is a South African cricketer. He made his Twenty20 debut for Mpumalanga in the 2018 Africa T20 Cup on 14 September 2018. In April 2021, he was named in Mpumalanga's squad, ahead of the 2021–22 cricket season in South Africa.

References

External links
 

1996 births
Living people
South African cricketers
Mpumalanga cricketers
Place of birth missing (living people)